Kozelnik is a village and municipality in Banská Štiavnica District, in the Banská Bystrica Region of Slovakia. The first written mention of the village dates from 1518.

Genealogical resources

The records for genealogical research are available at the state archive "Statny Archiv in Banska Bystrica, Slovakia"

 Roman Catholic church records (births/marriages/deaths): 1786-1912 (parish B)
 Lutheran church records (births/marriages/deaths): 1738-1909 (parish B)

See also
 List of municipalities and towns in Slovakia

External links
Surnames of living people in Kozelnik

Villages and municipalities in Banská Štiavnica District